Guilden Sutton is a civil parish and village in Cheshire West and Chester, England.  It contains three buildings that are recorded in the National Heritage List for England as designated listed buildings, all of which are at Grade II.  This is the lowest of the three grades, which contains "buildings of national importance and special interest".

Buildings

See also
Listed buildings in Barrow
Listed buildings in Christleton
Listed buildings in Great Boughton
Listed buildings in Mickle Trafford

References
Citations

Sources

Listed buildings in Cheshire West and Chester
Lists of listed buildings in Cheshire